Baba Vali (also Romanized as Bābā Valī and Bābāwāli) is a village in Deylaman Rural District, Deylaman District, Siahkal County, Gilan Province, Iran. At the 2006 census, its population was 62, in 22 families.

References 

Populated places in Siahkal County